Sead Sarajlić (born 30 July 1957) is a Bosnian-Herzegovinian retired footballer.

Club career
Sarajlić was one of the most influential players of Sloboda Tuzla during the late 1970s and 1980s. He had a short six months spell in the Yugoslav giant Partizan, winning the Yugoslav First League 1982-83, but left them after not impressing the manager Miloš Milutinović. He also played for GOŠK Dubrovnik and other clubs in Austria and Germany.

Post-playing career
After retiring he has coached youth teams at FK Sloboda Tuzla.

References

External links
 Stats from Yugoslav leagues at Zerodic
 Short career story at Yogabonita

1957 births
Living people
Sportspeople from Tuzla
Association football midfielders
Yugoslav footballers
FK Sloboda Tuzla players
FK Partizan players
NK GOŠK Dubrovnik players
SC Eisenstadt players
Yugoslav First League players
Austrian Football Bundesliga players
Yugoslav expatriate footballers
Expatriate footballers in Austria
Yugoslav expatriate sportspeople in Austria